Last Chance Romance is a 2008 comedy in two acts written by American playwright Sam Bobrick and published by Samuel French, Inc.

Synopsis
As stated on the back cover of the play, "Myra Witzer, a strong willed woman in her late thirties, is determined to get married at any cost and Leonard Shank, an unassuming man in his early forties is the guy she goes after and gets, much against his will.  After several months of married life, Myra realizes that the chase excited her more than the capture and wants out.  On the other hand, Leonard, who at the beginning wanted no part of the marriage to Myra, now wants to stay married to her more than anything."

External links
 Partial online script
 Samuel French, Inc.
 Official Website of Sam Bobrick

2008 plays
Plays by Sam Bobrick